The qualification for the 2020 Women's Olympic beach volleyball tournament allocated quota places to 24 teams. A maximum of two teams per country was allowed to qualify.

Qualification summary

Host country

FIVB reserved a vacancy for the Olympics host country to participate in the tournament.

World Championships

One team qualified from the 2019 World Championships.

Intercontinental Olympic Qualification Tournament

The top two teams from the FIVB Beach Volleyball Olympic Qualification Tournament qualified.

Olympic Ranking
15 teams qualified from the Olympic Ranking.

African Continental Cup

Asian Continental Cup

European Continental Cup

North American Continental Cup

South American Continental Cup

References

Qualification for the 2020 Summer Olympics
Impact of the COVID-19 pandemic on the 2020 Summer Olympics